Martina Fitzgerald may refer to:

 Martina Fitzgerald (Canadian journalist)
 Martina Fitzgerald (Irish journalist)